In algebraic geometry, the tautological ring is the subring of the Chow ring of the moduli space of curves generated by tautological classes. These are classes obtained from 1 by pushforward along various morphisms described below. The tautological cohomology ring is the image of the tautological ring under the cycle map (from the Chow ring to the cohomology ring).

Definition 

Let  be the moduli stack of stable marked curves , such that

 C is a complex curve of arithmetic genus g whose only singularities are nodes,

 the n points x1, ..., xn are distinct smooth points of C,

 the marked curve is stable, namely its automorphism group (leaving marked points invariant) is finite.

The last condition requires  in other words (g,n) is not among (0,0), (0,1), (0,2), (1,0). The stack  then has dimension . Besides permutations of the marked points, the following morphisms between these moduli stacks play an important role in defining tautological classes:

 Forgetful maps  which act by removing a given point xk from the set of marked points, then restabilizing the marked curved if it is not stable anymore.

 Gluing maps  that identify the k-th marked point of a curve to the l-th marked point of the other. Another set of gluing maps is  that identify the k-th and l-th marked points, thus increasing the genus by creating a closed loop.

The tautological rings  are simultaneously defined as the smallest subrings of the Chow rings closed under pushforward by forgetful and gluing maps.

The tautological cohomology ring  is the image of  under the cycle map. As of 2016, it is not known whether the tautological and tautological cohomology rings are isomorphic.

Generating set 

For  we define the class  as follows. Let  be the pushforward of 1 along the gluing map  which identifies the marked point xk of the first curve to one of the three marked points yi on the sphere (the latter choice is unimportant thanks to automorphisms). For definiteness order the resulting points as x1, ..., xk−1, y1, y2, xk+1, ..., xn. Then  is defined as the pushforward of  along the forgetful map that forgets the point y2. This class coincides with the first Chern class of a certain line bundle.

For  we also define  be the pushforward of  along the forgetful map  that forgets the k-th point. This is independent of k (simply permute points).

These pushforwards of monomials (hereafter called basic classes) do not form a basis. The set of relations is not fully known.

Theorem. The tautological rings are invariant under pullback along gluing and forgetful maps. There exist universal combinatorial formulae expressing pushforwards, pullbacks, and products of basic classes as linear combinations of basic classes.

Faber conjectures 

We omit n when it is zero (when there is no marked point).

In the case  of curves with no marked point, Mumford conjectured, and Madsen and Weiss proved, that for any  the map  is an isomorphism in degree d for large enough g. In this case all classes are tautological.

Conjecture (Faber). (3) The product (coming from the Chow ring) of classes defines a perfect pairing 

Parts (1) and (2) of the conjecture were proven. If the set of relations found by these methods is complete then the Gorenstein conjecture is wrong.

 Virtual classes of the moduli space of stable quotients (over ) by Pandharipande and Pixton.

 Witten's r-spin class and Givental-Telemann's classification of cohomological field theories, used by Pandharipande, Pixton, Zvonkine.

 Powers of theta-divisor on the universal abelian variety, by Grushevsky and Zakharov.

These four methods are proven to give the same set of relations.

However, Petersen-Tommasi proved that  and  fail to obey the (analogous) Gorenstein conjecture. On the other hand, Tavakol proved that for genus 2 the moduli space of rational-tails stable curves  obeys the Gorenstein condition for every n.

See also 
ELSV formula
Hodge bundle
Witten's conjecture

References 

Algebraic geometry
Moduli theory